The Journal of Materials in Civil Engineering is a monthly peer-reviewed scientific journal established in 1989 by the American Society of Civil Engineers. It covers research and best practices concerns on development, processing, evaluation, applications, and performance of construction materials in civil engineering. It consists of four sections: cementitious material, asphalt, geo-materials, and hybrids (which encompass steel, timber, masonry, and composite materials).

Abstracting and indexes
The journal is abstracted and indexed in Ei Compendex, ProQuest databases, Civil engineering database, Inspec, Scopus, and EBSCO databases.

References

External links

 
Engineering journals 
American Society of Civil Engineers academic journals
Monthly journals
Materials science journals
English-language journals
Publications established in 1989